Leonard William Armstrong was a Grand Dragon of the White Knights, Tennessee's Ku Klux Klan. On the night of June 10, 1990 with Damien Patton driving, Armstrong shot at the West End Synagogue with a TEC-9. The two were later assisted by Christian music producer and KKK member Jonathan David Brown. He was indicted for civil rights violations in December 1991 and pled guilty, taking a plea bargain, in April 1992. He served 42 months in prison. Talking with OneZero in 2020, Armstrong was remorseful, stating he "was the guy who was at the root of this whole thing". He also said he has joined Life After Hate.

References

Former Ku Klux Klan members
Living people
Year of birth missing (living people)
American Ku Klux Klan members